Virar (Pronunciation: [ʋiɾaɾ]) is a coastal city in taluka Vasai and district of Palghar, India. It is clubbed into Vasai-Virar city, administered by Vasai-Virar Municipal Corporation. It lies in south part of Palghar District in Vasai Taluka and north to the city of Mumbai. It is an important part of Palghar District, Because Palghar is the outermost part of northern side of Mumbai Metropolitan Region.

Virar railway station is one of the prominent railway station on the Western Line of Mumbai Suburban Railway due to being the station on the line with high frequency of local-train transit for both ends, Palghar (Dahanu) as well as Churchgate (South Mumbai).

Virar City is governed by Municipal Corporation and is situated in Maharashtra State, India. Virar is connected by roads to [[[Mumbai- Ahmedabad Express Highway]]] at Virar Phata(An exit node of highway towards Virar). Virar is famous for Jivdani Temple (Virar East) and Arnala Fort and Arnala Beach in the west in the northern coastal area of konkan region.

As per provisional reports if Census of India, population of Virar in 2011 is 1,222,390; of which male and female are 648,172 and 574,218 respectively.

Geography

Virar lies on the western coast of Maharashtra, to the north of Mumbai and experiences warm, humid climate throughout the year.

July is the wettest month while January is the driest.

The closest airports to Vasai-Virar are
 Chhatrapati Shivaji Maharaj International Airport (BOM) 
 Pune Airport (PNQ) 
 Surat Airport (STV)

History and culture

The name Virar, as some believe, comes from the Hindu Goddess Ekvira, mother of the immortal sage Parshuram. Just as Tunga Parvat becomes "Tunga-ar", similarly "Vira" becomes "Vira-ar". Virar is also home to the ruins of a grand temple of Goddess Ekvira Devi on the banks of Vaitarna River at the foothills Tunga Parvat which according to folklore was gradually destroyed amidst the raiding and looting by Mohamedeans and the subsequent rule by Portuguese.

Local legend describes this site as the final destination of the Shurparaka Yatra.

A massive Kund dedicated to Goddess Ekvira stands in this city even today under the banner of Ekvira Theerth or Virar Theerth, west of which stone carvings about 3 feet long and 9 inch broad in size can be found. Female figurines of Yoginis of Ekvira devi can be found in the same vicinity alongside roughly cut stone statues of cow and calf, an identifier of the Govardhan Math which symbolises Moksha and footprints of a cow carved in stone.

Historically, Virar has been home to Agri (caste) Samaj primarily involved in fishing, salt-making and rice farming. Large number of Koli people are inhabitants of the region as well.

Virar and several other nearby regions including the coveted Vasai Fort was under the direct control of the Portuguese during the 16th century before being recaptured by the Maratha Empire in a hard-fought Battle of Vasai led by Chimaji Appa against the odds in 1739.

To celebrate his victory and to fulfil a vow taken in front of Devi Vajreshwari, Chimaji Appa had a temple built for the goddess nearby. The Vajreshwari Temple still stands there as a relic of Maratha glory.

Demographics
According to the 2011 India census, Virar has a population of 1,221,233, of which 649,535 are male and 571,698 are female. Virar has an average literacy rate of 91.95%, higher than the national average of 59.5%; male literacy rate is 81%.

Over a period of time Virar has become a cosmopolitan suburb with approximately 50% population being Marathi speaking and the rest a mix of other communities, mainly the Gujaratis and the Catholics. 70% of the population is below 30 years. The slow and gradual adoption of the cosmopolitan nature of the city is the result of migration from the Mumbai mainland to this part due to ever increasing cost of the real estate property.

Among minority languages, Gujarati is spoken by 28.30% of the population and Hindi by 15.31%.

Education
The city's public school system is managed by the education ministry of the Government of Maharashtra. Hence the syllabus is under the state pattern devised by the Maharashtra State Board of Secondary and Higher Secondary Education. There are also other private schools that offer syllabi under Central Board of Secondary Education (CBSE) and Indian Certificate of Secondary Education (ICSE) guidelines besides the state pattern. The late Shri Vishnu Waman Thakur Charitable trust (VIVA College) and the Agashi-Virar-Arnala Education Society are the two most prominent bodies which have opened many institutes offering education ranging from kindergarten to PhD degrees in Virar. One can get graduate and post graduate degrees in Arts, Commerce, Science, Management studies and Technology through these institutes.

Tourism and places of attraction
Despite being in close proximity to the ever busy lifestyle of Mumbai, Virar manages to be a well known tourist place for many reasons.

Jivdani Temple

This temple of Goddess Jivdani is located around 1375 steps above the ground level, atop a hill in the eastern part of the city. It is very crowded especially during the Navratri festival. Many people in the region especially the Dhiwar, Aagri, Mangelas, the Kolis and the Bhandaris, worship the goddess as their family deity. The Papadkhind dam situated at the foothills, was one of the major source of fresh water in the location and was managed by Dhiwar community, but it was not enough because of the growing population of Virar.

Vajreshwari temple

Vajreshwari is known for its temple and hot water springs. It is mentioned in ancient "Puran" or holy books as a place blessed by the footsteps of Lord Rama and Lord Parashuram. In medieval ages Vajreshwari was known as Vadvali. It was called Vajreshwari after reincarnation of Vajrayogini in the Vajreshwari area. There are 52 steps to climb up to the main temple. It offers a commanding view of surrounding area from the temple. There are hot water springs in the Vajreshwari area as well as in Ganeshpuri and in Akloli. The hot water springs are a must bath for Vajreshwari devi devotees. The springs have high sulphur content and is believed to cure many skin ailments.

Baronda Devi Mandir

Baronda devi Temple is located near Papad Khind Dam, atop hill in Virar East.

Uttamrao Patil Udhyan is botanical garden in the papad Khind area of Virar. Spread over an area of 4 acres near the Shiv mandir of Papad Khind it is built with the help of Maharashtra Van Vibhag(Maharashtra Forest Department). It has a collection of various trees and types of flowers with information displayed on the boards. Also a nursery is set up in the udhyan for growing rare plants. Major attractions in the garden include the Panchavati baug, the Navgraha baug and the Aromatic Baug within the garden to name a few.

Holy Spirit Church

The Holy Spirit Church is located in Nandhakhal, a village and parish in Virar west. The church is believed to be 450 years old and was built by the Portuguese after their arrival to the Vasai region. But the old structure has undergone several repairs and constructions over the years and Church also has a school named ST.Joseph English school

St. Peters Church
This church was erected in the early part of the 20th century and was one of the first under the Archdiocese of Bombay. Fr. Ismail Da Costa, built a hut chapel in 1919 near Arnala beach. Later with help from local people of all faiths he constructed the Church of St. Peter. Archbishop Joaquim Lima (Archbishop of Bombay) blessed the church on 27 Dec 1931. Other historical churches in neighbourhood are St. James Church (Agashi) and Church of Holy Spirit (Nandakhal).

St. James Church

The St. James church located at Agashi on the road connecting Virar and Arnala, was first built in 1581. Portuguese were the best known seafarers among the European clans who built homes near the sea wherever they went. 'Agasi', the then small port village was one such place. Owing to its nearness to the sea and availability of wood from the jungles, which the Portuguese needed for boat building and constructions, Agashi soon became a permanent settlement for the Portuguese. The St. James Church that came into being during this early period was built using stones and bricks hence it withheld during the Muslim attacks of 1594. But during the raids of Marathas of 1739 it was mostly destroyed. The Marathas however permitted the priests to carry on religious ceremonies in the region and the church was rebuilt by 1760. In the year 1900 the church was renovated.

Jain Temple

For Jain Community (Sthanakwasi Jain, Deravasi and Others) all around Mumbai, this Jain Temple located at Agashi, about 5 kilometres from the Virar railway station is very famous amongst Jains who visit this place Daily and specially on Saturdays, as it is one of the very old temples in Mumbai and the adjoining region. This 200-year-old temple has carvings of the Lords of Jain community like Shri Mahavir, Lord Ghantagharan bhagvan and some specially decorated carvings of old times. Agashi temple also has overnight staying options for tourists travelling from far distance, especially for commuters coming to visit from all over Mumbai. Also due to people's demand a new Jain temple at Agashi has been developed.

Beach and resorts
The Arnala beach and Rajodi beach is situated just a few km west of the railway station. some others are Navapur beach and Vatar beach, just a few minutes away from Rajodi beach. most of these beaches are secluded and serene. These are a favourite spot for the teenagers and elderly alike. There are regular State transport buses and autos that carry the tourists to the beaches from the railway station. There are many resorts such as the Visava Resort, Kshitij water park and Resort, Arnala Beach Resort, Anand Resort, Mamta Resort, Patil Resort, Yesh Resort, the Green Paradise resort, Swagat resort, etc. With resort there is also one famous cake shop in Virar which is Kekmart that have come up recently owing to the increase in a number of people coming from the main city land. The major occupation of farmers near Arnala beach is floriculture and they cultivate a wide variety of flowers. They also cultivate rice and various vegetables.

Amusement parks 
Yazoo Park, developed by Rustomjee and Evershine developers , spread over 12 acres, was started in 2011. Yazoo park is the center point of attraction with so many international level rides & games. people of the Virar and nearby areas from Borivali to Dahanu visit Yazoo park with family and kids.  It is located at Global City, near Narangi Phata level crossing about 10 minutes from Virar Railway Station. It boasts of entertainment such as Toy Trains, Giant Wheel, Merry-Go-Round, Free Fall, Game Zone, Bump'em Cars, Floating Restaurant, etc.

The Great Escape water park located near the Western Express Highway, off the Vajreshwari-Parol-Bhivandi road is a picnic place with water park rides, a picturesque environment, and a variety of food facilities and cuisine like Gujarati, Chinese and Continental Food.

Sports
Virar is the closest and the best place near Mumbai for paragliding training. Being a coastal area the winds at Virar are laminar, predictable and ideal for aviation sports. Early morning and evening winds are suitable for beginners and mid and early afternoon conditions are perfect for advance flyers. Black Beauty hill, Twin Rock hill, Jivdani hill, Tungareshwar, Kaner hills are a few locations for hill flying.

Vasai-Virar Kala Krida Mahotsav is an annual sports event for the sportsperson of Virar and the neighbouring localities. The event has been a great success for the last 17 years, with participation coming from regional schools, colleges and grampanchayats. Other games like Karate and Kho kho have created state level players. Every year this event is conducted at the year end precisely from 26 Dec to the new years night at the Chimajiappa Playground and the New English School, Vasai.

Heritage sites
 Arnala Fort is located on a small island off the Arnala port. Since the fort is built on an island and surrounded on all sides by water it is also known as "Jaldurg" or "Janjire Arnala". The Portuguese called the island "Ilha das vacas" which means 'Island of the cows' in Portuguese. Before the Portuguese control of the island, the island was controlled by the Muslim rulers of Gujarat. The island is near the mouth of Vaitarna river and the Portuguese used it to observe and control shipping and navigation along the western coast. The Portuguese captain of Bassein donated the island to a Portuguese nobleman. The nobleman tore down the old fort and began construction of 700-foot by 700-foot fort. The fort was never completed by the nobleman but remained under Portuguese control.
 Vasai fort (Bassein fort) is also located nearby. The Portuguese established a fort in Bassein, present day Vasai, on the mainland just north of the Bombay archipelago. The fort was fronted by a harbour. With this as the main base, they built other smaller forts, and strong houses in many of the islands. In the 18th century the fort was attacked by the Marathas under Baji Rao Peshwa, and fell in 1739 after a three-year-long campaign. The remains of the fort can be reached by bus or taxi from the Vasai railway station. The ramparts overlook Vasai creek and are almost complete, though overgrown. Several watch-towers still stand, with safe staircases leading up.

Bollywood connection
Govinda, a leading Bollywood superstar of current period, voted as the tenth greatest star of stage or screen of the last thousand years by BBC News Online users and also an ex Member of Parliament used to stay in Virar in his school days. He passed out from Annasaheb Vartak Smarak Vidyamandir in Virar East.

Military Tank in Virar
The military tank in Virar is placed at VIVA College. The tank is from the Kargil War. The tank was retired in October 2013. It has been in Virar since 15 August 2018.

VVMC Mayors Marathon
Every year the Vasai Virar Mayors Marathon is held which sees stars from across the country criss-crossing the entire Vasai-Virar suburb on the race day and is also a source of great attraction as well as enthusiasm for the people of Virar. The 2014 version of the marathon was held on December 21 and saw Cricket Legend Sachin Tendulkar as well as Anju Bobby George as the Chief Guest.

St. Mother Teresa Church 
Virar is home to the only church dedicated to St. Mother Teresa of Calcutta in the state of Maharashtra. The church was blessed by Bishop Thomas Dabre (The first bishop of Vasai) in 2007. The church is located near the Platform No.1 of the Western Railway station of Virar. They have a vibrant Charismatic Prayer Service every Thursday evening; with special healing and deliverance prayers on the 4th Thursdays of every month.

Infrastructure
The growth of Virar is yet to be seen in full as the quadrupling of the railway line between Borivali and Virar has just taken place in 2007. The railways are still pleading the lack of sufficient number of rakes to take full advantage of the quadrupling.

The global city developed by rustomjee and evershine builders is a big township spread over an area of more than 200 acers leading to significant development and new settlements.

The city has seen a lot of development in the past 5 years. The Municipal Council was upgraded to Vasai-Virar Municipal Corporation in May 2009. There are various housing and road transport development projects initiated by the corporation with the help of MMRDA, Mumbai. The skywalk in the west section of the city was one of the first amongst the many skywalks that were built near all the railway stations of Mumbai. It was the seventh skywalk in the city and it cost INR 91.5 million. Virar-West skywalk is 589 meters long with four meters wide walkway. The skywalk was found to be the busiest amongst the others built by the MMRDA by recording a footfall of 58,038 commuters during peak hours. It was followed by Santa Cruz skywalk with a figure of 37,546.

The Virar East skywalk is uniquely built as it goes right over the Totale lake, situated in the backdrop of the huge VVMC corporation building. A viewing tourist gallery is built in the middle of the 285 m long skywalk.

Virar-Alibaug Corridor Project is a project undertaken by the MMRDA. The Rs 10,000-crore project is expected to provide seamless connectivity by the metro as well as by road from Alibaug to Virar. The corridor will bypass the western and eastern suburbs and also the routes which will witness growth in the future. The proposed alignment will connect four crucial national highways, NH8 (Mumbai-Ahmedabad), NH3 (Mumbai-Agra-Delhi), NH4 (Mumbai-Chennai) and NH17 (Goa-Mangalore-Kerala). The MMRDA has claimed that the 140-km corridor will reduce the long commute to barely an hour. Phase-I of the corridor will be of 90 km from Virar to Panvel. Phase-II will be of 50 km from Panvel to Alibaug.

Governance
Virar falls under the jurisdiction of the newly created Vasai-Virar Municipal Corporation (VVMC). It primarily comes in the Nalla Sopara constituency for the Maharashtra Legislative Assembly elections and in the Palghar constituency for the Lok Sabha elections. For all the three seats, the ruling party, Bahujan Vikas Aaghadi (BVA) has showed its dominance over the past few decades. The BVA has won 55 seats out of the 89 in the VVMC; thus Virar elected its first Mayor in the form of Shri. Rajeev Patil who was also the ex-President of the preceding Virar Municipal Council. For the Legislative Assembly seat, Kshitij Thakur, a BVA candidate and the son of ex-MLA of the region, Hitendra Thakur, won the seat in 2009, defeating Shirish Chavan of the Shiv Sena by more than 40,000 votes at just 26 years of age. Earlier in the 15th Lok Sabha elections, people voted for Baliram Sukur Jadhav, also a BVA candidate, from the Palghar constituency, who went on to become the Member of Parliament representing the region, defeating a Bharatiya Janata Party rival, advocate Chintaman Vanga, by 12,358 votes.

References

External links 

 https://vvcmc.in/en/

Neighbourhoods in Mumbai
Cities and towns in Palghar district
Palghar district
Vasai-Virar